The 1999 Asian Super Cup was the 5th Asian Super Cup, a football match played between the winners of the previous season's Asian Club Championship and Asian Cup Winners Cup competitions. The 1999 competition was contested by Júbilo Iwata of Japan, who won the 1998–99 Asian Club Championship, and Al Ittihad of Saudi Arabia, the winners of the 1998–99 Asian Cup Winners' Cup.

Route to the Super Cup

Júbilo Iwata 

1Júbilo Iwata goals always recorded first.
2 The match was played over one leg by mutual agreement.

Al Ittihad 

1 Al Ittihad goals always recorded first.

Game summary 

|}

First leg

Second leg

References
 Asian Super Cup 1999

Asian Super Cup
Super
International club association football competitions hosted by Saudi Arabia
International club association football competitions hosted by Japan
Asia
Ittihad FC matches
Júbilo Iwata matches